Heart is an American rock band from Seattle, Washington. Formed in 1967, the group later consisted of vocalist Ann Wilson, guitarist Roger Fisher, bassist Steve Fossen, drummer Brian Johnstone and keyboardist John Hannah. Shortly after the group's formation, Wilson's younger sister Nancy joined as rhythm guitarist, Johnstone was replaced by Michael Derosier and Hannah by Howard Leese. The band's current lineup includes the Wilson sisters, drummer Denny Fongheiser (from 1993 to 1995, and since 2019), guitarists Craig Bartock (since 2003) and Ryan Waters (since 2019), bassist Andy Stoller and keyboardist Dan Walker (both since 2019).

History

1967–1995
Heart formed in 1967 as the Army, which featured guitarist Roger Fisher, bassist Steve Fossen and drummer Mike Fisher (Roger's brother). The group went through a number of lineup changes in its early years, as well as changing its name to White Heart (also sometimes credited simply as Heart) and later Hocus Pocus. Once it had settled on the name Heart in 1973, the band included Roger Fisher and Fossen, vocalist Ann Wilson (who became romantically involved with Mike Fisher), drummer Brian Johnstone and keyboardist John Hannah. Wilson's younger sister Nancy joined as rhythm guitarist the following year (and became romantically involved with Roger Fisher), while Hannah and Johnstone were replaced by Howard Leese and Michael Derosier, respectively, upon the band's signing with Mushroom Records in 1975.

After the release of the band's first four albums, Fisher was fired from Heart in October 1979 due to increased tensions within the group, stemming from his lifestyle and breakup with Nancy Wilson. Leese took over the role of the band's lead guitarist, as they remained a four-piece. Fossen and Derosier also left after the recording of 1982's Private Audition, with Mark Andes and Denny Carmassi taking their respective positions. Both members remained with the band until the early 1990s; Andes left in 1992, prior to recording for the following year's Desire Walks On, before Carmassi followed the next year, after performing on said album. Following the album's release, the departed Andes and Carmassi were replaced by Fernando Saunders and Denny Fongheiser, respectively.

1995–2019
Heart spent several years in the late 1990s on temporary hiatus as the Wilson sisters worked on other projects, including together in new group the Lovemongers. The band toured occasionally without Nancy Wilson, adding lead guitarist Frank Cox, rhythm guitarist Scott Olson, bassist Jon Bayless and drummer Ben Smith. After a tour in 1998, long-time guitarist and keyboardist Leese left the band, later joining the solo band of Paul Rodgers. Ann and Nancy Wilson began touring in 1999 for the first time without a backing band. In 2002, a new lineup of Heart was introduced featuring returning members Olson and Smith, as well as new bassist Mike Inez and keyboardist Tom Kellock. The following year, Olson and Kellock were replaced in the Heart touring lineup by Gilby Clarke and Darian Sahanaja, respectively.

Sahanaja remained for Heart's first studio album in eleven years, Jupiters Darling, which also featured Clarke's replacement Craig Bartock. Debbie Shair replaced Sahanaja after the album's release. Ric Markmann became Heart's new bassist in 2005, after Inez's former band Alice in Chains reformed. Markmann left the touring lineup in 2009, introducing the band to his eventual replacement Kristian Attard, although he would later work with the band in the studio for Red Velvet Car and Fanatic. Dan Rothchild took over on bass in 2012. Chris Joyner replaced Shair in 2014. During late 2016, 2017 and 2018, Heart was on hiatus after an incident in which Ann Wilson's husband Dean Wetter was arrested for assaulting Nancy Wilson's children outside the venue in which the sisters were performing.

2019 onwards
In February 2019, it was announced that Heart had reformed for a new concert tour. The lineup for the tour includes returning guitarist Craig Bartock and former drummer Denny Fongheiser, plus new members Ryan Waters on guitar, Andy Stoller on bass and keyboardist Dan Walker.

Members

Current

Former

Timeline of members

Lineups

References

External links
Heart official website

Heart